Events in the year 1936 in the British Mandate of Palestine.

Incumbents
 High Commissioner – Sir Arthur Grenfell Wauchope
 Emir of Transjordan – Abdullah I bin al-Hussein
 Prime Minister of Transjordan – Ibrahim Hashem

Events

 19 April – Twenty Jews are killed in riots following the funeral of two Jews murdered on 15 April in Jaffa.
 19 April – The call for a general strike in Nablus marks the beginning of the 1936–1939 Arab revolt in Palestine against the British colonial rule and mass Jewish immigration.
 23 April – With the commencement of the Arab revolt, the British authorities evacuate the Jewish community of Hebron as a precautionary measure to secure its members' safety, thus ending the Jewish presence of Hebron.
 25 April – The Arab Higher Committee is established, on the initiative of the Mufti of Jerusalem Hajj Amin al-Husayni, to oppose British rule and Jewish claims in Palestine.
 10 December – The founding of the moshav Tel Amal which was the first of the tower and stockade settlement.

Unknown dates
 The founding of the moshav Kfar Hittim
 The founding of the moshav Rishpon

Births
 1 January – Ofira Navon, Israeli psychologist and wife of President Yitzhak Navon (died 1993)
 8 March – Ram Oren, Israeli author
 19 March – Uri Aviram, Israeli professor of social work
 23 March – Israel Eliraz, Israeli poet (died 2016)
 9 April – Ghassan Kanafani, Palestinian Arab writer, playwright and a leading member of the militant group PFLP (died 1972)
 17 April – Daniel Friedmann, Israeli law professor and politician
 18 April  – Moshe Levi, Israeli general, 12th IDF Chief of General Staff (died 2008)
 15 May – Ruth Almog, Israeli novelist
 31 May – Zevulun Hammer, Israeli politician, minister and Deputy Prime Minister (died 1998)
 14 June – Avraham Shochat, Israeli politician
 20 June  – Amiram Barkai, Israeli biochemist (died 2014)
 19 July – Nahum Stelmach, Israeli footballer and manager (died 1999)
 19 July – Ran Ronen-Pekker, Israeli Air Force general and ace (died 2016)
 31 July  – Uzi Yairi, Israeli special forces officer, commander of the Sayeret Matkal commando unit (died 1975)
 22 August – Nechama Hendel, Israeli singer, actress, guitarist and entertainer (died 1998)
 4 September – Judea Pearl, Israeli-American computer scientist and philosopher
 11 September – Moshe Gershuni, Israeli painter and sculptor (died 2017)
 7 October – Moshe Abeles, Israeli neuroscientist
 16 October – David Glass, Israeli civil servant and politician (died 2014)
 28 October - Joram Lindenstrauss, Israeli mathematician (died 2012)
 5 November – Amos Yudan, Israeli businessman
 17 November – Dahlia Ravikovitch, Israeli poet (died 2005)
 27 November – Yitzhak Yitzhaky, Israeli educator and politician (died 1994)
 27 November – Shlomo Aronson, Israeli landscape architect (died 2018)
 27 November – Zaid al-Rifai, former Jordanian Prime Minister
 3 December  – Adam Zertal, Israeli archaeologist (died 2015)
 19 December – A. B. Yehoshua, Israeli novelist, essayist, and playwright (died 2022) 
 25 December – Masha Lubelsky, Israeli politician
 Full date unknown
Yoram Dinstein, Israeli legal scholar, law professor, and diplomat
Dov Tamari, Israeli general

Deaths
 23 September - Meir Dizengoff (born 1861), Russian (Bessarabia)-born Zionist politician and the first mayor of Tel Aviv

References

 
Palestine
Years in Mandatory Palestine